Bread and Roses is a 1967 East German drama film directed by Heinz Thiel and Horst E. Brandt. It was entered into the 5th Moscow International Film Festival.

Cast
 Günther Simon as Georg Landau
 Harry Hindemith as Paul Kallam
 Eva-Maria Hagen as Jutta Lendau geb. Krell
 Carola Braunbock as Emmi Krell
 Helga Göring as Dr. Helene Seydlitz
 Johanna Clas as Eleanore Mergenthin
 Fred Delmare as 	Kurt Kalweit
 Jürgen Frohriep as Siegfried Schlentz
 Helmut Schreiber as Emil
 Horst Kube as Börner
 Günther Polensen as Erich
 Willi Schrade as Willi

References

External links
 

1967 films
1967 drama films
German drama films
East German films
1960s German-language films
German black-and-white films
1960s German films